Baschleiden is a village in the commune of Boulaide, in north-western Luxembourg.  , the village had a population of 176.

It was the birthplace of Charles-Gérard Eyschen (1800–1859), who became Director-General for Justice., and of Hieronymus Busleyden (1470?-1517), archdean of Cambrais, member of the High Council of Mechlin for the Burgundy lands, and co-founder (with Erasmus) of Leuven's Collegium Trilingue, a.k.a. Collegium Buslidium. His city mansion in Mechlin, Hof van Busleyden, is now a museum. In Leuven, the Busleydengang (Busleyden Alley) leads to what's left of Trilingue.

Footnotes

References
 

Boulaide
Villages in Luxembourg